Contagious is the eighth studio album by American heavy metal band Y&T, released in 1987 through Geffen Records, which, like their previous label A&M Records, is now a subsidiary of Interscope Records (itself owned by Universal Music Group). It is the first Y&T studio album to feature a different line up since their debut album, with Jimmy DeGrasso replacing Leonard Haze on drums after he left the band in 1986.

The band used outside co-writers on many songs for the album. Taylor Rhodes has written hits for Aerosmith and Celine Dion and produced and wrote on an album by glam metal band Kix, the song "Temptation" is credited to Kennemore along with Megadeth and Savatage guitarist Al Pitrelli and Danger Danger bassplayer Bruno Ravel, while Robert White Johnson who cowrote "Eyes of a Stranger" with Rhodes also wrote songs for Celine Dion and Doro among many others.

30,000 albums were pressed with the title "Boys Night Out" instead of "La Rocks." This was due to the song title chosen for that song that came from Jesse Harms (Sammy Hagar's keyboardist at the time) who was working with Dave Meneketti at the time but when Geffen released a Sammy Hagar album using the actual song written by Harms, "Boys Night Out," Y&T was forced to change the title on the insistence of David Geffen.

The album peaked at #78 on the Billboard 200.

Track listing

Personnel

Band members
 Dave Meniketti – vocals, guitar, acoustic guitar
 Joey Alves – guitar, acoustic guitar
 Phil Kennemore – bass, backing vocals
 Jimmy DeGrasso – drums

Additional musicians
 Steffen Presley – Keyboards

Production
 Kevin Beamish – producer, engineer, background vocals
 Scott Boorey – producer, engineer, executive producer, management 
 Bruce Barris – engineer
 Wally Buck – assistant engineer, assistant
 Kevin Elson – mixing at Fantasy Studios, background vocals
 Greg Fulginiti –mastering
 Hugh Syme – art Direction
 Bill Traut – assistant, management 
 Glen Wexler – photography

Charts

References

Y&T albums
Geffen Records albums
1987 albums
Albums produced by Kevin Beamish
Glam metal albums